Heterocyathus is a genus of coral of the family Caryophylliidae.

Species
 Heterocyathus aequicostatus Milne-Edwards and Haime, 1848 (type species)
 Subspecies Heterocyathus aequicostatus delicatus Sakakura, 1935
 Subspecies Heterocyathus aequicostatus parasiticus Semper, 1872
 Heterocyathus alternatus Verrill, 1865
 Heterocyathus antoniae Reyes, Santodomingo & Cairns, 2009
 Heterocyathus hemisphaericus Gray, 1849
 Heterocyathus sulcatus (Verrill, 1866)
 Heterocyathus cochlea (Spengler, 1781)
 Heterocyathus eupsammides Gray, 1849
 Heterocyathus hemisphericus Gray, 1849
 Heterocyathus heterocostatus Harrison, 1911
 Heterocyathus incrustans (Dennant, 1906)
 Heterocyathus japonicus (Verrill, 1866)
 Heterocyathus lamellosus (Verrill, 1865)
 Heterocyathus mai Cheng, 1971
 Heterocyathus oblongatus Rehberg, 1892
 Heterocyathus parasiticus Semper, 1872
 Heterocyathus philippensis Semper, 1872
 Heterocyathus philippinensis Semper, 1872
 Heterocyathus pulchellus Rehberg, 1892
 Heterocyathus roussaeanus Milne-Edwards & Haime, 1848
 Heterocyathus rousseaui (Milne-Edwards & Haime, 1857)
 Heterocyathus woodmasoni Alcock, 1893

Ecology
'Mobility of this genus is facultative which means they have the capacity to move around but not always will they exhibit it. Heterocyathus could have zooxanthellae in shallow water, however, they may live on without symbiotic algae at deeper depths. The Heterocyathus species is sometimes hermatypic or a hard coral primarily responsible for reef-building. In the case of Heterocyathus, reefs are made as the species produces layers of calcium carbonate beneath their bodies.  They show epifaunal characteristics and hence are seen in deeper areas of water. They are microcarnivores feeding on tiny organisms. A species of hermit crabs, Diogenidae Heteropsammia, allows for the Heterocyathus the ability to roam around the seafloor.

Symbiotic Relationships
Heterocyathus has both a mutualism and parasitism relationship with another organism called the Albian scleractinian- sipunculan (commonly known as a type of worm). The coral benefits since the worm offers nutrients and food, meanwhile the worm benefits since the coral is a form of protection or shelter. However, if the shell of the coral outgrows the worm, the worm benefits by gaining total protection, thus making a parasitism relationship 
 http://journals.plos.org/plosone/article?id=10.1371/journal.pone.0184311

References

Caryophylliidae
Scleractinia genera